Bovalino is a comune (municipality) in the Province of Reggio Calabria in the Italian region Calabria, located about  southwest of Catanzaro and about  east of Reggio Calabria.

The municipality of Bovalino contains the frazioni (subdivisions, mainly villages and hamlets) Bosco S. Ippolito, Belloro, Russellina, Bricà, S. Nicola, Pozzo, Bovalino Superiore, Biviera, Rosa, and Cipparello.

Bovalino borders the following municipalities: Ardore, Benestare, Casignana, San Luca.

Bovalino was also the birthplace of the Blessed Camillus Costanzo.

Demographic evolution

References

External links
 www.comune.bovalino.rc.it/

Cities and towns in Calabria